Greece is competing at the 2014 European Athletics Championships in Zürich, Switzerland, from 12–17 August 2014. Greek Athletics named a team of 26 athletes.

Medals

Results

Men
 Track and road

Field events

Women
 Track and road

Field events

References

Nations at the 2014 European Athletics Championships
2014
European Athletics Championships